An eyewear retailer or eyewear store is a retail businesses selling eyewear and often providing optometry services. Eyewear retailers may sell any number of different products, including sunglasses, spectacles, contact lenses, sports eyewear, and safety and protection eyewear.

The sector is driven by the rising global population, economic development, increased consumer purchasing power, and the global prevalence of ocular diseases. The increased use of digital screens has led to an increase in vision impairment, cataracts, myopia, hypermetropia, eye irritation, dry eyes, computer vision syndrome and double vision.

Sunglasses make up 42% of the global eyewear market as of 2020. They protect the eyes from sun damage and conjunctivitis, but are also sold as fashion accessories, with many consumers opting to have a number of sunglasses for different occasions.

Contact lenses are the fastest-growing product segment. They offer a natural field of view, no frames, reduced distortion, and no fog or glare.

Many eyewear retailers are owned by EssilorLuxottica, including Clearly.ca/Coastal.com, Eyebuydirect, FramesDirect.com, LensCrafters, OPSM, Pearle Vision, Sears Optical, Sunglass Hut, Target Optical and Vision Source. The company's market dominance featured in an episode of Tru TV program Adam Ruins Everything.

History

Revenue in the eyewear retail sector declined 14.2% between 2019 and 2020, with the onset of the COVID-19 pandemic.

The sector recovered quickly in 2021.

The global eyewear market is projected to be worth US$111.12 billion by 2026, and US$172.42 Billion by 2028.

References

See also

 Clothing retailer
 Optometry